Berlin Requiem may refer to:

The Berlin Requiem (Weill), 1928 composition by Kurt Weill to poems by Bertolt Brecht
The Berlin Requiem (Autopsia album)